Alexander Stanislavovich Dogiel (1852 in Panevėžys – 1922 in Saint Petersburg), was a Russian Empire histologist and neuroscientist. The cells of Dogiel, bipolar neurons of the spinal ganglia, are named after him.

Biography 
Dogiel studied at Kazan University where he graduated in 1883. He inaugurated his career in 1885 as a monitor in embryology. Then he taught and practiced histology, first in Tomsk from 1888, then in 1892 at the Saint Petersburg Medical Institute where he was entrusted with the organization of the histology laboratory. He founded the Russian Archives of Anatomy, Histology and Embryology (Рус, архив анатомии, Gistology and Embryology).

Dogiel lived and worked in isolation, rarely but authoritatively publishing lengthy and richly illustrated articles. His work focused on degenerative and regenerative neuromuscular junction abnormalities, neuromuscular spindles, and various cellular categories within the central nervous system. He demonstrated a mastery of silver staining techniques and some of his illustrations contain a level of detail comparable to that which can be obtained using a low-power electronic microscope.

Dogiel was an important figure in Russian histology. He trained Russian scientists such as Vladimir Bekhterev, Babukin, Yakulovich and Doinnikov in this specialty, but never went to visit his colleagues from Western Europe.

Major works 
 Die sensiblen Nervenendigungen im Herzen und in den Blutgefässen der Säugethiere. Archiv für Mikroskopische Anatomie 1898; 52: 44-70.
 Die Endigungen des sensiblen Nerven in den Augenmuskeln und deren Sehnen beim Menschen und den Saugietieren. Arch Mikr Anat 1906; 68 : 501-22.
 Der Bau der Spinalganglien des Menschen und der Säugetiere. Jena: Fischer, 1908

References 

Russian neuroscientists
Histologists
20th-century Russian physicians
19th-century physicians from the Russian Empire
Pages with unreviewed translations
1852 births
1922 deaths